Juan Carlos Fernández Garzón (born March 3, 1976) is a male weightlifter from Colombia. He won a silver medal for his native South American country at the 1995 Pan American Games. He also competed at the 1996 Summer Olympics, finishing in 8th place in the men's flyweight division.

References

External links
 Sports-reference

1976 births
Living people
Colombian male weightlifters
Olympic weightlifters of Colombia
Weightlifters at the 1996 Summer Olympics
Weightlifters at the 1995 Pan American Games
Place of birth missing (living people)
Weightlifters at the 1999 Pan American Games
Pan American Games silver medalists for Colombia
Pan American Games bronze medalists for Colombia
Pan American Games medalists in weightlifting
Medalists at the 1995 Pan American Games
Medalists at the 1999 Pan American Games
20th-century Colombian people
21st-century Colombian people